Cycloteuthis is a genus of squid in the family Cycloteuthidae. It is distinguished from the genus Discoteuthis by the presence of a tail on the mantle. The species C. akimushkini is currently considered a junior synonym of C. sirventi, however this is inconclusive and the World Register of Marine Species has C. akimushkini as a valid species.

The genus contains bioluminescent species.

References

External links
 Tree of Life web project: Cycloteuthis

Squid
Cephalopod genera
Bioluminescent molluscs